Hapoel Dror Haifa F.C. was a football club from Haifa, Israel.

History
The club was established in 1940 by Jewish immigrants from Thessaloniki and for the first years played junior football. The club entered the 1946 Palestine Cup, where it lost its two first round matches against Maccabi Petah Tikva. The club entered the second division for the 1947–48 season, which was interrupted and abandoned due to the outbreak of the 1947–48 Civil War in Mandatory Palestine. As league matches resumed, in 1949, the club re-joined the second division, called Liga Meuhedet (lit. Special League), finishing fourth in the North division. The club competed in the second division, which was renamed Liga Bet in 1951, for two additional seasons, folding at the end of the 1953–54 season.

References

1940 establishments in Mandatory Palestine
Association football clubs established in 1945
1953 disestablishments in Israel
Association football clubs disestablished in 1953
Defunct football clubs in Israel
Hapoel football clubs
Football clubs in Haifa
History of Haifa